The 2003 Tripura Legislative Assembly election took place in a single phase on 26 February to elect the Members of the Legislative Assembly (MLA) from each of the 60 Assembly Constituencies (ACs) in Tripura, India. Counting of votes occurred on 1 March 2003. The results were ready within the day.

The Communist Party of India (Marxist) (CPI(M)), led by Manik Sarkar, won 38 seats and formed a Government in Tripura

Highlights
Election to the Tripura Legislative Assembly were held on February 26, 2003.  The election were held in a single phase for all the 60 assembly constituencies.

Participating Political Parties

No. of Constituencies

Electors

Performance of Women Candidates

Results

Constituency wise Winners

Government Formation
The 18 member Left Front ministry led by Chief Minister Manik Sarkar, sworn in on 7 March 2003.

References

State Assembly elections in Tripura
Tripura